El Acil, meaning "The Authentic", is an Algerian daily newspaper in French language published in Constantine, capital of the north-east of Algeria. The newspaper was established in 1993. It belongs to the EURL Inter-Med-Info group, which owns the Arabic Al Acil and L'Authentic, another French-language newspaper. El Acil′s manager is Nacer Tafraout, and the editor is Abdelkrim Zerzouri.

External links
 El Acil homepage

1993 establishments in Algeria
French-language newspapers published in Algeria
Mass media in Constantine, Algeria
Newspapers established in 1993
Newspapers published in Algeria